Marle Hall (also Marl Hall) is a Grade II listed Georgian building in Conwy County Borough, North Wales, situated close to Llandudno Junction and Snowdonia National Park.

History
The first Marle Hall was built by Sir Hugh Williams, 5th Baronet (1628–1686), of the Williams baronets, of Penrhyn. It was a Jacobean mansion (c.1661), then substantially expanded in the early 18th-century in the Georgian style. It passed by marriage out of the Williams family to Terence Prendergast (died 1776). 

A fire in the 18th century reduced the Hall to one wing, with the other parts left roofless. On the basis of a suggestion of 1875 by John Price (1803–1887) ("Old Price"), the Hall has been considered to have been a source for the poem "The Haunted House" by Thomas Hood. 

The Marle estate was subsequently bought by Thomas Williams of Llanidan. Owen Williams, his great-grandson, sold it off in 1889, and Marle Hall went to Corbet Woodall.

By 1898 Marle Hall was used as a convalescent home, and it underwent restoration at the turn of the century. Since 1971 the property has been owned by Warwickshire County Council who have operated it as an outdoors learning centre providing residential trips and courses for schoolchildren in Warwickshire. Activities on offer at the facility include canoeing, rock climbing and hiking, and it became a popular venue for educational trips from the Warwickshire, as well as other areas. The building received its listed status in 1950.

Pandemic times
In March 2020 the COVID-19 pandemic forced the facility to temporarily close. In December 2020, Warwickshire County Council's Cabinet proposed that its Marle Hall Centre for Outdoor Learning be closed permanently in 2021. In January 2021, a 7,000 signature petition to keep the facility open was presented to Warwickshire County Council, with many signatories emphasising the important role they felt outdoors learning can have for children. In August 2021, the council voted to sell the property, citing its high maintenance cost and under use in recent years, as well as the large amount of work that would be required to renovate and modernise it, estimated to be around £850,000 over ten years. Warwickshire County Council scheduled the facility's closure date for 22 October 2021, with schools that had booked places at the venue after that being offered help to make alternative arrangements.

References

Grade II listed buildings in Conwy County Borough
Buildings and structures in Conwy County Borough
Outdoor recreation in Wales
Education in Warwickshire